Wildwood is a neighborhood located in the Forest Glen Community Area on the Far Northwest side of Chicago, Illinois.

The community is triangular in shape and is bordered by Lehigh Avenue, Caldwell Avenue (Route 14), Touhy Avenue, and Devon Avenue. The Edgebrook Metra Station faces Wildwood at the intersection of Devon, Lehigh, and Caldwell.
The most notable features of Wildwood are rustic, including curb-less streets and massive trees towering above the homes. A satellite view of Wildwood compared to other nearby Chicago communities shows its number of trees. Wildwood provides the entrance to Bunker Hill Forest Preserve and the North Branch Bicycle Trail (ending at the Botanical Gardens in Glencoe, Illinois). The community of Wildwood contains few businesses or rental options, as it is primarily a community of single-family homes. The neighborhood is home to Wildwood Park and Wildwood Elementary School. Wildwood Elementary is now known as Wildwood World Magnet School after undergoing extensive renovations in the last decade.

North Edgebrook
North Edgebrook is the northern section of Wildwood Neighborhood. Bordered by Touhy Avenue, Mason Avenue, Caldwell Avenue (Route 14), and Mendota Avenue. It was once known as the Suburb inside Chicago.

Wildwood Park
Wildwood Park (6950 N. Hiawatha Ave), which is located in North Edgebrook near the border with Wildwood, contains one senior and two junior baseball fields, a softball field, one football field, two tennis courts, and one playground. Wildwood Park is also known for its Junior Bears football team, the Wildwood Seminoles. Youth in 6th, 7th, and 8th grade can participate in Junior Bears or the cheerleading program. Wildwood Park is active during the summer months, with multiple sports activities and kids' play happening simultaneously. Wildwood Community is host to a large Independence Day celebration with a parade through the streets to the party in Wildwood Park.
Bob Cole, the long-time park director and Wildwood Packers football coach, made a "wall of fame" in the fieldhouse, featuring children of the neighborhood. Photos and news clippings cover the walls and ceilings, memorializing the community members who have contributed to the park. The gymnasium is shared with Wildwood School, where basketball, floor hockey, and recreational tumbling programs take place.

References

Neighborhoods in Chicago
North Side, Chicago